You're Back in the Room is a British television game show that was broadcast on ITV from 14 March 2015 to 9 April 2016. The show was hosted by Phillip Schofield and starred Keith Barry. The premise consists of contestants who have to complete a series of normally straightforward tasks after being subject to "deep hypnosis", causing them to be compelled to develop various distracting tics or quirks that hinder their ability to compete.

A second series consisting of four episodes was announced on 21 July 2015 and began airing on 12 March 2016.

On 7 October 2016, it was announced that the show had been axed.

Episodes

Series 1 (2015)

Series 2 (2016)

Reception
The show has received mixed reviews; Sarah Deen, in a Metro article, summarised that "everyone either completely loved or absolutely hated [the show]". Adam Postans described You're Back in the Room as "one of the worst prime-time shows you'll ever see" in a Daily Mirror article. Sam Wollaston gave the programme a mixed review, describing it as "quite funny for a while", but said it went "backwards from Brown to McKenna". Ben Travis of the Evening Standard described the show as "watchably daft". Benji Wilson from The Daily Telegraph gave the show a very positive review, opining that it is "significantly funnier than anything else on TV".

International versions

References

External links

2010s British game shows
2015 British television series debuts
2016 British television series endings
English-language television shows
ITV game shows